Tawau Hills Park, was established in 1979, primarily as a protection for the water catchment area of Tawau town, Sabah, Malaysia. It is located 24 kilometres from Tawau, and comprises 279.72 km² of lowland dipterocarp rainforest, surrounded by oil palm and cacao plantations. The park offers picnic areas, camping sites, and chalets. The Park contains rugged volcanic landscapes including a hot spring and spectacular waterfalls. The highest point in the park is Gunung Magdalena (1310 m).  It is administered by the Sabah Parks.

See also
 List of national parks of Malaysia

External links
 Maps of Tawau Hills National Park

Tawau
National parks of Sabah
Protected areas established in 1979
1979 establishments in Malaysia
Borneo lowland rain forests